Armadale is a village near the southern end of the Sleat peninsula on the Isle of Skye, in the Highland council area of Scotland. Like most of Sleat, but unlike most of Skye, the area is fairly fertile, and though there are hills, most do not reach a great height. It looks out over the Sound of Sleat, to Morar and Mallaig.

The name ’Armadale’, meaning ‘elongated valley’, derives from the Old Norse armr and dalr.
Clan Donald has a visitor centre situated next to the ruins of Armadale Castle and surrounded by large gardens, while the nearby Sabhal Mòr Ostaig is a centre of Gaelic learning.

The village is also a small port, and has a regular Caledonian MacBrayne ferry service to Mallaig. It is at the southern end of the A851 road.
When walking on the beach near the pier, it is possible to see otters and seals.

Ferry service

References

External links

 The Clan Donald Visitor Centre and Museum of the Isles, Armadale 

Populated places in the Isle of Skye